Stella Zakharova (born 12 July 1963 in Odessa, Ukraine) is a retired gymnast who competed internationally for the former Soviet Union between 1977 and 1982.  She was an Olympic and World Championship gold medalist in team competitions, and won individual all-around titles at other events.

Zakharova won her first all-around championship at the 1976 All-Union School Spartakiade.  That same year she placed second overall in the Junior USSR Championships.  She was a consistently strong competitor through 1977-78, winning several vaulting and floor exercise event titles.  A powerful tumbler, Zakharova was the first woman to incorporate three double-back somersaults into her floor routine.

Zakhrova's most successful year was 1979, during which she won individual all-around championships at the American Cup, Moscow News, and World Cup events.  At the World Championships held in Fort Worth, Texas she was a member of the Soviet women's team which finished second to the Romanian squad led by an injured Nadia Comăneci.  It was the first time the Soviets had failed to beat their Romanian rivals in a major team competition.

In 1980 Zakharova continued to enjoy success, winning the gold medal with her Soviet teammates at the Olympic games and capturing a second all-around title at the World Cup.  That proved to be her high-water mark, as her performances began to decline from 1981 onward.

After retirement, Stella Zakharova married Dynamo Kiev football player Viktor Khlus.  The couple have a son and a daughter.  Zakharova's home country Ukraine hosts an annual Stella Zakharova Cup competition in artistic gymnastics, named in her honor.

Footage of Stella Zakharova training with the Soviet national team was captured in a 1978 Soviet Gymnastics training documentary; Zakharova appears about one minute into the clip . Included in the film are teammates Elena Mukhina, Natalia Shaposhnikova and Maria Filatova.

External links
 List of Competitive Results at Gymn Forum
 Stella Zakharova's Web Site (Russian language)
 Stella Zakharova CUP Site

1963 births
Living people
Sportspeople from Odesa
Ukrainian female artistic gymnasts
Soviet female artistic gymnasts
Medalists at the World Artistic Gymnastics Championships
Olympic medalists in gymnastics
Medalists at the 1980 Summer Olympics
Olympic gold medalists for the Soviet Union
Universiade medalists in gymnastics
Universiade gold medalists for the Soviet Union
Universiade silver medalists for the Soviet Union
Universiade bronze medalists for the Soviet Union
Gymnasts at the 1980 Summer Olympics
Olympic gymnasts of the Soviet Union
Medalists at the 1981 Summer Universiade